Jeanette Hegg Duestad (born 11 January 1999) is a Norwegian sport shooter, born in Tønsberg. She represented Norway at the 2020 Summer Olympics in Tokyo 2021, where she placed fourth in women's 10 metre air rifle.

At the 2022 European 25/50 m Events Championships, she won a gold medal in 50m rifle 3 positions mixed team, together with Jon-Hermann Hegg.

References

External links
 
 
 

 

1999 births
Living people
People from Tønsberg
Norwegian female sport shooters
Shooters at the 2020 Summer Olympics
Olympic shooters of Norway
21st-century Norwegian women